Exaeretia niviferella is a moth of the family Depressariidae. It is found in Ukraine, Russia (Uralsk, Daghestan), Azerbaijan, Kazakhstan and north-western China.

References

Moths described in 1872
Exaeretia
Moths of Europe
Moths of Asia